Minuscule 682 (in the Gregory-Aland numbering), ε 157 (von Soden), is a Greek minuscule manuscript of the New Testament, on parchment. Palaeographically it has been assigned to the 11th century. The manuscript has complex contents. Scrivener labelled it by 533e.

Description 

The codex contains the text of the four Gospels, on 309 parchment leaves (size ). The text is written in one column per page, 18 lines per page.
The first page being in gold.

There is also a division according to the smaller Ammonian Sections (in Mark 233), a references to the Eusebian Canons.

It contains Epistula ad Carpianum, the Eusebian Canon tables, several Prolegomena to the four Gospels, Prolegomena, and subscriptions at the end.

It has unusual marginal note on folio 28 recto.

According to the CSNTM description it has 308 pages.

Text 

Kurt Aland did not place it in any Category.

The manuscript was not examined by using the Claremont Profile Method.

History 

Scrivener and Gregory dated the manuscript to the 11th century. Currently the manuscript is dated by the INTF to the 11th century.

It was added to the list of New Testament manuscript by Scrivener (533) and Gregory (682). It was examined by Guildford.

The manuscript was acquired along with seven other manuscripts (556, 676, 677, 678, 679, 680, and 681) by the late Sir Thomas Phillips, at Middle Hill in Worcestershire. The manuscript was held in London (Cheltenham 7757). In the twenties of the twentieth century it was transferred to United States.

Actually the manuscript is housed at the Scriptorium (VK 905), Orlando, Florida.

Gallery

See also 

 List of New Testament minuscules
 Biblical manuscript
 Textual criticism

References

Further reading

External links 

 Images of Minuscule 682 at the CSNTM

Greek New Testament minuscules
11th-century biblical manuscripts